The 2013 Pulitzer Prizes were awarded on April 15, 2013 by the Pulitzer Prize Board for work during the 2012 calendar year.

Prizes
There were 21 prizes awarded in three categories.

Journalism

Letters and drama

Music

Special Citation
Not awarded in 2013.

Notes

References

External links
Pulitzer Prize official website

Pulitzer Prizes by year
Pulitzer Prize
Pulitzer
Pulitzer Prize
Pulitzer Prize
April 2013 events in the United States